The 2019–20 season is Instituto's 15th consecutive season in the second division of Argentine football, Primera B Nacional.

The season generally covers the period from 1 July 2019 to 30 June 2020.

Review

Pre-season
On 10 May 2019, Mateo Klimowicz agreed a move to German side Stuttgart; penning a five-year deal. On 22 May, Instituto announced their first off-season signing in goalkeeper Germán Salort from Agropecuario. Another notable departure was confirmed on 5 June, as centre-forward Pablo Vegetti, their top goalscorer in 2018–19, joined Belgrano. A double signing was revealed on 11 June, as Maximiliano López and José Villegas signed from lower league pair Villa Mitre and Sansinena. Also on that day, Leandro Vella left for Primera División team Godoy Cruz. Midfielder Damián Arce came through the door on 19 June from Almagro. Numerous loans from the past campaign officially expired on and around 30 June. Hours after, Instituto communicated the incoming of Facundo Silva.

Argentine-Chilean centre-forward Germán Estigarribia joined on 3 July, having most recently spent time with Deportes Antofagasta in Chile. Back-to-back meetings with Talleres kicked off Instituto's pre-season, though neither ended with victory; the initial encounter, a loss, was abandoned by the referee due to the aggressive nature of the match. Three days later, Instituto lost a friendly to Torneo Regional Federal Amateur outfit Atenas; in a fixture which celebrated their opponents' 103rd year of existence. Facundo Erpen penned a contract from San Martín on 11 July. Instituto drew in two friendlies with Central Córdoba on 16 July. They then fell to a draw and a defeat to Belgrano in exhibition games on 20 July. Sebastián Navarro headed to second tier All Boys on 23 July.

Instituto travelled to the Estadio Bautista Gargantini to face Independiente Rivadavia in friendlies on 27 July, playing out a 1–1 tie before losing 1–0. The same overall outcomes occurred on 3 August when Instituto met Sportivo Belgrano, which took their winless pre-season streak to eleven matches. On 5 August, Sarmiento publicised the arrival of Facundo Castelli. Instituto concluded their exhibition preparations with consecutive defeats at home to Güemes on 9 August. 12 August saw Facundo Affranchino depart to Villa Dálmine. On 15 August, Francisco Apaolaza became Instituto's eighth new addition.

August
Instituto's bad form continued into their opening day fixture in Primera B Nacional, as Villa Dálmine scored in either half to secure a 2–0 victory on 17 August. New signing German Estigarribia was unable to feature competitively for Instituto in early August, due to a dispute with his former club Deportes Antofagasta regarding the player's contractual status. Sarmiento ran out winners in a five-goal league match against Instituto to 22 August. Roberto Castoldi replaced Gastón Defagot as president on 26 August. Estigarribia's paperwork was fully completed on 30 August.

September
Instituto avoided defeat in competitive action for the first time on 2 September, as they and Deportivo Riestra cancelled each other out at the Estadio Guillermo Laza; in a fixture that saw Juan Ignacio Sills debut, despite no official club announcement of his arrival.

Squad

Transfers
Domestic transfer windows:3 July 2019 to 24 September 201920 January 2020 to 19 February 2020.

Transfers in

Transfers out

Loans in

Loans out

Friendlies

Pre-season
Friendlies with city rivals Talleres was scheduled in June for 6 July. Fixtures with Central Córdoba and Atenas were set on 4 July, with the latter celebrating Atenas' 103rd year of existence. Instituto would also travel to face Belgrano and Independiente Rivadavia in pre-season. In August, Instituto would face Sportivo Belgrano and Güemes.

Competitions

Primera B Nacional

Results summary

Matches
The fixtures for the 2019–20 league season were announced on 1 August 2019, with a new format of split zones being introduced. Instituto were drawn in Zone B.

Squad statistics

Appearances and goals

Statistics accurate as of 3 September 2019.

Goalscorers

Notes

References

Instituto Atlético Central Córdoba seasons
Instituto